Casey Tibbs is a Paralympian athlete from America competing mainly in category P44 pentathlon events.

He competed in the 2004 Summer Paralympics in Athens, Greece.  There he won a gold medal in the men's 4 x 100 metre relay - T42-46 event, a silver medal in the men's Pentathlon - P44 event and finished fifth in the men's 400 metres - T44 event.  He also competed at the 2008 Summer Paralympics in Beijing, China.    There he won a gold medal in the men's 4 x 100 metre relay - T42-46 event, a bronze medal in the men's Long jump - F44 event, did not finish in  the men's Pentathlon - P44 event and finished fourth in the men's 200 metres - T44 event

External links
 

Paralympic track and field athletes of the United States
Athletes (track and field) at the 2004 Summer Paralympics
Athletes (track and field) at the 2008 Summer Paralympics
Paralympic gold medalists for the United States
Paralympic silver medalists for the United States
Paralympic bronze medalists for the United States
American pentathletes
American male long jumpers
American male sprinters
Living people
Medalists at the 2004 Summer Paralympics
Medalists at the 2008 Summer Paralympics
Year of birth missing (living people)
Paralympic medalists in athletics (track and field)